Al-Harmushiyah (Harmoushieh) is a town in eastern Syria, administratively part of the Deir ez-Zor Governorate. The town is located, on the Euphrates northwest of the city of Deir ez-Zor. It is across the Euphrates from the town of Al-Tabni. 

In 1961 Soviet geologists discovered very pure salt deposits near the town. 

During the Syrian Civil War, the town was occupied by ISIL until the SDF captured it on 4 October 2017.

Climate
Al-Harmushiyah has a desert climate. What little rain falls, falls during the winter, about  annually. The Köppen-Geiger climate classification is BWh.

Notes and references

Populated places in Deir ez-Zor District
Populated places on the Euphrates River
Towns in Syria